Elections to Liverpool City Council were held on 8 May 1952.

After the election, the composition of the council was:

Election result

Ward results

* - Councillor seeking re-election

(PARTY) - Party of former Councillor

Comparisons are made with the 1949 election results.

Abercromby

Aigburth

Allerton

Anfield

Breckfield

Brunswick

Castle Street

Childwall

Croxteth

Dingle

Edge Hill

Everton

Exchange

Fairfield

Fazakerley

Garston

Granby

Great George

Kensington

Kirkdale

Little Woolton

Low Hill

Much Woolton

Netherfield

North Scotland

Old Swan

Prince's Park

Sandhills

St. Anne's

St. Domingo

St. Peter's

Sefton Park East

Sefton Park West

South Scotland

Vauxhall

Walton

Warbreck

Wavertree

Wavertree West

West Derby

Aldermanic Elections
Twenty of the forty Aldermen were elected by the city council on 19 May 1952.

* - re-elected aldermen.

All Aldermen and the wards they were allocated to as Returning Officer are shown in the table below:

By-elections

Breckfield by-election 13 November 1952

Following the death of Alderman Walter Thomas Lancashire on 18 August 1952, Cllr. David John Lewis was elected as Alderman by the City Council on 3 September 1952 and assigned as returning officer for the Netherfield ward.

Following the death of Alderman James Conrad Cross on 18 August 1952, Cllr. George William Prout was elected as Alderman by the City Council on 3 September 1952 and assigned as returning officer to the Anfield ward.

Following the election of Cllr. David John Lewis and Cllr. George William Prout as Aldermen, there was a by-election for 2 seats for the Breckfield ward on 13 November 1952.

References

1952
1952 English local elections
May 1952 events in the United Kingdom
1950s in Liverpool